In Defense of My Own Happiness (stylized in all lowercase) is the third studio album and major label debut by American singer-songwriter Joy Oladokun. It was released on June 4, 2021, by Amigo Records, Verve Forecast Records, and Republic Records and serves as the sequel to her second studio album In Defense of My Own Happiness (The Beginnings) (2020). It was promoted by eight singles released throughout 2020 and 2021, and includes two previous singles from The Beginnings, "Sunday" and "Breathe Again". The album features guest appearances from Jensen McRae, Maren Morris, and Penny & Sparrow. On July 30, 2021, a "complete edition" was released featuring all the songs from both albums, as well as two new songs.

In Defense of My Own Happiness was listed as one of the best albums of 2021 by American Songwriter and Billboard, the sixth best folk album of the year by PopMatters, and among the best albums of the first half of 2021 by Rolling Stone. The album was nominated for the GLAAD Media Award for Outstanding Breakthrough Music Artist.

Background
After releasing two independent studio albums, Carry (2016) and In Defense of My Own Happiness (The Beginnings) (2020), Oladokun signed a record deal with Amigo Records and Verve Forecast Records under the Republic Records umbrella. Prior to this her music had been featured in various television shows like This Is Us, Grey's Anatomy, Catfish, The L Word: Generation Q, and Station 19 and named one of NPR's Artists to Watch.

In In Defense of My Own Happiness, Joy Oladokun sings about her experience as a queer Black woman born to Nigerian immigrants and raised in a small town in Arizona. It tackles issues like religious trauma, coming out, racial bias, and male privilege. Much of the album was recorded in Oladokun's East Nashville home studio. Oladokun attempts to lift up other Black and queer people with her music, saying in an interview with Nashville Scene, "I do feel like a sense of calling and camaraderie for people who have also been through similar things or had events that evoke similar emotions of loneliness and stress. I feel a responsibility to serve the global community in that way."

Promotion
The album was promoted by eight singles, "If You Got a Problem", "I See America", "Look Up", "Mighty Die Young", "Wish You the Best", "Jordan", "Sorry Isn't Good Enough", and "Bigger Man". "If You Got a Problem, "Wish You the Best", and "Sorry Isn't Good Enough" all received official music videos. "Bigger Man" was sent to adult alternative radio on June 7, 2021.

Oladokun performed "Breathe Again" on The Tonight Show Starring Jimmy Fallon on February 9, 2021, and on Today on February 19, 2021. She performed "Look Up", "I See America", and "Sunday" on Hulu's Your Attention Please virtual Black History Month concert on February 18, 2021. She played "Sunday" on The Late Show with Stephen Colbert on June 24, 2021.
She performed "If You Got a Problem", "Sunday", "I See America", and "Jordan" for Rolling Stones "In My Room" at-home concert series on June 15, 2021. She performed "If You Got a Problem", "Taking the Heat", "I See America", and "Sunday" for NPR Tiny Desk Concert on August 20, 2021. On October 16, 2021, she performed "If You Got a Problem" on CBS Mornings. She played "Taking the Heat" on Austin City Limits on January 15, 2022. She performed "I See America" on Jimmy Kimmel Live! on January 19, 2022.

Critical reception
Jake Uitti of American Songwriter called In Defense of My Own Happiness "a stunning first album–tender, personal, and pensive–and indicates there is more where this came from." Billboard writer Taylor Simz praised Oladokun's songwriting, saying "With each song, the album feels like stepping one foot deeper into a lake to be baptized through Oladokun’s gospel, as her soothing voice, piano and frequent claps wash over the listener. Her candor creates a sincere space for fans to take in the world from her perspective as she tackles racist biases on 'I See America' and double standards on the Maren Morris joint effort, 'Bigger Man.'" Rolling Stone's Jon Freeman said that "Oladokun never hides her past struggles or pain in her lyrics, but as with songs like 'If You Got a Problem' and 'Look Up,' she’s always seeking out the light to point the way, making for one of the year’s most uplifting listens." Jonathan Frahm of PopMatters said "Production is crisp, and arrangements are easily accessible yet meticulously crafted. It’s Oladokun’s magnificent heart that takes center stage, though, with her songs coming off as her meditations as a Black, LGBTQ+ woman."

Track listing

Notes
All song titles stylized in all lowercase, except "Bigger Man" and "Who Do I Turn To?"

Personnel

Musicians

Joy Oladokun – vocals , bass, drums, guitar, keyboards, percussion, programming
Dave Bassett – programming
Bobby Chase – violin
Ian Fitchuk – programming
Peter Groenwald – programming
Austin Hoke – cello
Betsy Lamb – viola
Jensen McRae – vocals
Maren Morris – vocals
Penny and Sparrow – vocals
David Pramik – drums, guitar
Jimmy Robbins – banjo, keyboards, percussion, piano, programming
Robopop – programming
Kristin Weber – violin

Technical

Dale Becker – mastering
Joshua Berkman – A&R
Pedro Calloni – mixing
Dahlia Ambach Caplin – A&R
Chloe Clements – A&R
Fili Fizziola – assistant mastering engineer, mastering
Clint Gibbs – mixing
Mike "Frog" Griffith – production coordinator
Conor Hedge – assistant mastering engineer
Jordan Lehning – string arranger, recording engineer
Sean Moffit – mixing
David Pramik – recording engineer
Jimmy Robbins – recording engineer
Konrad Snyder – mixing
Hector Vega – assistant mastering engineer

Complete edition only

Jon Castellini – mixing
Ben Didelot – mastering engineer, mixing
"Spider" Ron Entwistle – guitar
Tim Gent – vocals
George Hazelrigg – Hammond B3, piano
Nate Lotz – drums
Jeremy Lutito – programming
Logan Matheny – mixing
Rob Moose – strings
Jon Ossman – bass
Todd Simon – horn

Release history

References

Joy Oladokun albums
2021 albums
Verve Forecast Records albums
Republic Records albums
Albums produced by David Pramik
Albums produced by Jimmy Robbins
Albums recorded in a home studio